The following lists events that happened during 1904 in the Congo Free State.

Incumbent
Leopold II of Belgium

Events

See also

 Congo Free State
 History of the Democratic Republic of the Congo

References

Sources

 
Congo Free State
Congo Free State